Andrew Brian Porter (26 August 19283 April 2015) was a British music critic, opera librettist, opera director, scholar, and organist.

Biography
Born in Cape Town, South Africa, Porter studied organ at University College, Oxford in the late 1940s.  He then began writing music criticism for various London newspapers, including The Times and The Daily Telegraph. In 1953, he joined The Financial Times, where he served as the lead critic until 1972, where his successor was Ronald Crichton. Stanley Sadie, in the 2001 edition of the Grove Dictionary of Music and Musicians, wrote that Porter "built up a distinctive tradition of criticism, with longer notices than were customary in British daily papers, based on his elegant, spacious literary style and always informed by a knowledge of music history and the findings of textual scholarship as well as an exceptionally wide range of sympathies."

In 1960, Porter became the editor of The Musical Times. From 1972 to 1973 he served a term as the music critic of The New Yorker. Returning to the magazine in 1974, he remained its music critic until he moved back to London in 1992. His writings for The New Yorker won respect from leading figures in the musical world. The composer and critic Virgil Thomson, in a 1974 commentary on the state of music criticism, stated, "Nobody reviewing in America has anything like Porter's command of [opera]. Nor has The New Yorker ever before had access through music to so distinguished a mind." In particular, with operas that were unfamiliar to him, Porter exercised additional diligence in his preparation for his reviews. According to Opera News:

In his latter years, Porter wrote for The Observer, Opera, and The Times Literary Supplement.

Porter translated the libretti of 37 operas, of which his English translations of Der Ring des Nibelungen and The Magic Flute have been widely performed. He also directed several operas for either fully staged or semi-staged performance. He authored the librettos for John Eaton's The Tempest, after Shakespeare, and Bright Sheng's The Song of Majnun, based on the ancient Persian story.

As a scholar, Porter notably discovered excised portions of Verdi's Don Carlos in the library of the Paris Opera, which led to the restoration of the original version of the work. Porter was a consultant for a 1996 production at the Théâtre du Châtelet that used portions of the music which he had found.

In 2003, Porter was honored with the publication of a festschrift, Words on Music: Essays in Honor of Andrew Porter on the Occasion of His 75th Birthday.

Porter died of pneumonia on 3 April 2015. His twin sister was his only surviving relation. He continued attending performances, including one of Die Meistersinger, even while sick, and his final two reviews for Opera, of Gaetano Donizetti's Il furioso all'isola di San Domingo and I pazzi per progetto, went to press hours before his death.

Bibliography

Books
A Musical Season: A Critic from Abroad in America, Viking Press (1974), 
The Ring of the Nibelung (translation), Norton (1976) 
Music of Three Seasons, 1974–1977, Farrar, Straus and Giroux (1978), 
Music of Three More Seasons, 1977–1980, Knopf (1981), 
Verdi's Macbeth: A Sourcebook (with David Rosen), Cambridge University Press (1984), 
Musical Events: A Chronicle, 1980–1983, Summit Books (1987), 
Musical Events: A Chronicle, 1983–1986, Summit Books (1989),

References

External links
Interview with Andrew Porter, 24 March 1988
 Tom Huizenga, "Multifaceted Music Critic Andrew Porter Dies At 86".  National Public Radio, "Deceptive Cadence" blog, 3 April 2015
 New York Times profile

1928 births
2015 deaths
Alumni of University College, Oxford
English music critics
Classical music critics
Italian–English translators
German–English translators
The Times people
Financial Times people
The New Yorker critics
Writers from Cape Town
British opera directors
English organists
British male organists
English opera librettists
English male journalists
20th-century translators
21st-century translators
20th-century English non-fiction writers
21st-century English writers
Deaths from pneumonia in England
South African twins
20th-century English male writers
Presidents of the Critics' Circle
The Musical Times editors
Verdi scholars